This is a list of Armenian association football clubs.

Active clubs
 Alashkert
 Ararat-Armenia
 Ararat Yerevan

 Urartu
 Erebuni
 Gandzasar
 Junior Sevan
 Lokomotiv Yerevan
 Lori
Noah
 Pyunik
 Shirak
 Yerevan

Inactive clubs

 Abovyan
 Akhtala Tumanyan
 Akhtamar
 Almast
 Arabkir
 Aragats
 Araks
 Araks Ararat
 Armavir
 Arpa
 Aznavour
 Bentonit
 BKMA Yerevan
 Debed
 Dinamo Yerevan
 Dvin Artashat
 FIMA Yerevan 
 Geghard
 Hachen

 Impulse
 Karin
 Kilikia
 King Delux
 Kumayri
 Kotayk
 Lernagorts Vardenis
 Lernayin Artsakh
 Luys-Ararat
 Malatia
 Masis
 Mika
 Moush Charentsavan
 Moush Kasakh
 Nairi
 Nig Aparan
 Nork Marash
 Patani

 RUOR Yerevan
 Shengavit
 Shinarar
 Sipan
 SKVV Yerevan
 Spitak
 Spartak Yerevan
 Tufagorts
 Ulisses
 Vagharshapat
 Van Yerevan
 Vanadzor
 Yeghvard
 Yerazank
 Yerevan United
 Yezerk
 Zangezour
 Zvartnots-AAL

See also
 Football Federation of Armenia
 Sport in Armenia

 
clubs
Armenia
Football clubs